Omar Daniel (born 1960) is a Canadian composer and pianist, and an associate professor of composition at the Western University.

Early life and education
Daniel was born in Toronto, Ontario, of Estonian descent. He earned a Doctor of Music from the University of Toronto where he was a music composition pupil of John Beckwith.

Career
In 1997 he won the Jules Léger Prize for New Chamber Music for his Zwei Lieder nach Rilke, a work for soprano and chamber ensemble. At about that time he created a number of compositions for guitar which were performed at the Winnipeg New Music Festival and recorded by classical guitarist Rachel Gauk.

In 2003, he taught musical theory and practice at The Glenn Gould School in Toronto. In 2007 he received the K.M. Hunter Artists Award for classical music. He served on the faculty of Wilfrid Laurier University, and later became an associate professor of composition at the Western University.

Daniel was commissioned to create a non-verbal choral work for the Latvian Radio Choir, who performed it in Toronto in 2018. That year Daniel performed at Chamberfest in Ottawa.

In October 2020, Daniel released a CD Omar Daniel: Chamber Works, a collection of chamber pieces performed by the Land's End Ensemble as part of a long collaboration between the Canadian composer and this Juno-nominated, Calgary-based chamber group.

Selected compositions
"The Flaying of Marsyas"
 "Dreams of the Panther"
"STELCO"

Further reading

References

External links

"Omar Mark Daniel". SoundCloud. Retrieved 23 March 2021.

Living people
1960 births
Canadian male composers
Musicians from Toronto
Jules Léger Prize for New Chamber Music winners
Canadian classical composers
University of Toronto alumni
Academic staff of the University of Toronto
Academic staff of the University of Western Ontario